The Population, Resources and Environment Committee of the Chinese People's Political Consultative Conference is one of ten special committees of the Chinese People's Political Consultative Conference, China's top political advisory body and a central part of the Chinese Communist Party's united front system.

History 
The Population, Resources and Environment Committee was created in March 1998 during the 8th Chinese People's Political Consultative Conference.

List of chairpersons

References 

Special committees of the Chinese People's Political Consultative Conference
Organizations established in 1998
1998 establishments in China